Moora Important Bird Area comprises a fragmented area of 685 ha centred on the rural township of Moora, in the wheatbelt region of south-west Western Australia.  It lies about 175 km north of Perth.  Most of the site is private land.

Birds
The site has been identified by BirdLife International as an Important Bird Area (IBA) because it supports up to 60 breeding pairs of the endangered Short-billed Black Cockatoo as well as a population of the restricted-range Western Corella.  The site boundaries are defined by areas of suitable nesting habitat for the cockatoos along two road reserves and within Moora.

References

Wheatbelt (Western Australia)
Important Bird Areas of Western Australia
Moora, Western Australia